The FIS Nordic Junior World Ski Championships is an annual nordic skiing event organized by the International Ski Federation (FIS). The Junior World Championships was started in 1977 and was first hosted in Sainte-Croix, Switzerland. The Junior World Championship events include nordic skiing's three disciplines: cross-country skiing, ski jumping, and nordic combined (the latter being a combination sport consisting of both cross-country and ski jumping).

Editions

Notes:

 1984: First with nordic combined team event
 1986: First with 30 km (men) and 15 km (women) in cross-country skiing / First with ski jumping team event
 2000: First with sprint in cross-country skiing / First with sprint (5 km) in nordic combined
 2006: First with ski jumping for women / First with under-23 events
 2008: Originally scheduled in Szczyrk and Wisła
 2016: First with mixed team in ski jumping
 2019: Originally scheduled in Vuokatti / First with nordic combined for women
 2021: Originally scheduled in Szczyrk, Wisła and Zakopane
 2022: Originally scheduled in 2021

Multiple winners

Cross-country skiing

Men

Women

Nordic combined

Men

Women

Ski jumping

Men

Women

Footnotes

See also
FIS Nordic World Ski Championships

References

External links
FIS

 
Nordic Junior
Nordic skiing competitions
Ski Nordic
Nordic Junior
Recurring sporting events established in 1977